Pietro Mengoli (1626, Bologna – June 7, 1686, Bologna) was an Italian mathematician and clergyman from Bologna, where he studied with Bonaventura Cavalieri at the University of Bologna, and succeeded him in 1647. He remained as professor there for the next 39 years of his life.

Contributions
Mengoli first posed the famous Basel problem in 1650, solved in 1735 by Leonhard Euler. In 1650, he also proved that the sum of the alternating harmonic series is equal to the natural logarithm of 2.

Mengoli anticipated the modern idea of limit of a sequence with his study of quasi-proportions in Geometria speciose elementa (1659). He used the term quasi-infinite for unbounded and quasi-null for vanishing.
Mengoli proves theorems starting from clear hypotheses and explicitly stated properties, showing everything necessary ... proceeds to a step-by-step demonstration. In the margin he notes the theorems used in each line. Indeed, the work bears many similarities to a modern book and shows that Mengoli was ahead of his time in treating his subject with a high degree of rigor.

Six square problem
Mengoli became enthralled with a Diophantine problem posed by Jacques Ozanam called the six-square problem: find three integers such that their differences are squares and that the differences of their squares are also three squares. At first he thought that there was no solution, and in 1674 published his reasoning in Theorema Arthimeticum. But Ozanam then exhibited a solution: x = 2,288,168, y = 1,873,432, and z = 2,399,057. Humbled by his error, Mengoli made a study of Pythagorean triples to uncover the basis of this solution. He first solved an auxiliary Diophantine problem: find four numbers such that the sum of the first two is a square, the sum of the third and fourth is a square, their product is a square, and the ratio of the first two is greater than the ratio of the third to the fourth. He found two solutions: (112, 15, 35, 12) and (364, 27, 84, 13). Using these quadruples, and algebraic identities, he gave two solutions to the six-square problem beyond Ozanam’s solutions. Jacques de Billy also provided six-square problem solutions.

Works

Pietro Mengoli's works were all published in Bologna:
 1650: Novae quadraturae arithmeticae seu de additione fractionum on infinite series
 1659: Geometria speciosae elementa on quasi-proportions to extend Euclid's proportionality of his Book 5, six definitions yield 61 theorems on quasi-proportion
 1670: Refrattitione e parallase solare 
 1670: Speculattione di musica
 1672: Circulo
 1675: Anno on Biblical chronology
 1681: Mese on cosmology
 
 1674: Arithmetica rationalis on logic
 1675: Arithmetica realis on metaphysics

References

 G. Baroncini & M. Cavazza (1986) La Corrispondenza di Pietro Mengoli, Florence: Leo S. Olschki

External links
 
 Marta Cavazza, Pietro Mengoli in Dizionario biografico degli italiani

1626 births
1686 deaths
Catholic clergy scientists
Italian mathematicians
17th-century Italian mathematicians
Italian scientists
17th-century Italian scientists